Myrmeleontiformia is an insect clade in the order Neuroptera, and which was historically treated as a suborder. The phylogeny of the Neuroptera has been explored using mitochondrial DNA sequences, and while issues remain for the order as a whole, such as "Hemerobiiformia" being paraphyletic, Myrmeleontiformia is generally agreed to be monophyletic, with one study giving the following cladogram:

Superfamilies and families
Clade Myrmeleontiformia
 Superfamily Myrmeleontoidea (syn Nemopteroidea)
 Family Ascalaphidae: owlflies (possibly in Myrmeleontoidea)
 Family †Babinskaiidae 
 Family Myrmeleontidae: antlions (includes Palaeoleontidae)
 Family Nemopteridae: spoonwings etc (formerly in Myrmeleontoidea)
 Family Nymphidae: split-footed lacewings (includes Myiodactylidae)
 Family †Rafaelianidae
 Superfamily Psychopsoidea
 Family †Aetheogrammatidae
 Family †Kalligrammatidae 
 Family †Osmylopsychopidae (syn †Brongniartiellidae) 
 Family †Panfiloviidae (syn †Grammosmylidae)
 Family †Prohemerobiidae
 Family Psychopsidae: silky lacewings

References

External links